Nawar "Nora" al-Awlaki (2008/2009 – January 29, 2017) was an eight-year-old American citizen who was killed on January 29, 2017, during the Raid on Yakla, a commando attack ordered by  U.S. President Donald Trump. 

Conducted in southern Yemen, the raid was an attack on a branch of the terrorist group Al-Qaeda.

Nawar al-Awlaki's death gained national coverage and attention in both mainstream and online media sources. Nawar's grandfather, Nasser al-Awlaki, said of her killing, “She was hit with a bullet in her neck and suffered for two hours. Why kill children? This is the new U.S. administration – it's very sad, a big crime.” Nawar died with her mother and uncle by her side. Her alleged last words were, "Don't cry, mama. I'm fine." 

Nawar was the third member of her immediate family killed during military orders issued with executive powers. Her father, Anwar al-Awlaki, was the first to be killed by the executive branch when on September 30, 2011, CIA orders calling for a precision drone strike targeting him was given presidential approval by then President Barack Obama. Anwar al-Awlaki was alleged by the U.S. government to be a leader of al-Qaeda in the Arabian Peninsula that had gone "operational," although the US government has refused to declassify much of the evidence that led them to this conclusion. Two weeks after the death of her father, Nawar's sixteen-year-old half-brother, Abdulrahman, was also killed in a 2011 U.S. drone strike.

When reporter Sierra Adamson asked former White House Press Secretary Robert Gibbs about Abdulrahman's killing, considering he was an American citizen and still a minor, but killed without due process, Adamson was left with the following response:

See also
 Raid on Yakla
 Abdulrahman al-Awlaki

References

2017 deaths
Civilians killed in the War on Terror
American people of Yemeni descent
Anwar al-Awlaki
Trump administration controversies
2000s births